Glenorchy is a suburb of Hobart, in the state of Tasmania, Australia. The city officially begins at Creek Road New Town, in Hobart's northern suburbs, and includes, Moonah, Derwent Park, Lutana, Goodwood, Montrose, Rosetta, Berriedale, Chigwell, Claremont and Austins Ferry. It is the seat of the local government area of the same name, the City of Glenorchy.

Glenorchy draws its name from Glen Orchy, Scotland, meaning "Glen of tumbling waters".

Overview

Glenorchy was first occupied in the year 1804, being mostly agricultural land from the 1820s onward, with orchards being the prime commercial industry for the area. Becoming a municipality in 1864 and then officially a city in 1964, Glenorchy is now a largely suburban, working class area, which grew quickly after WWII when a great number of returning soldiers settled in the northern suburbs.

Glenorchy has entertainment facilities including the Glenorchy Pool, a Village Cinemas complex, KGV Oval which houses the Glenorchy Football Club, and a bowls club. Glenorchy is also home to the Tasmanian Transport Museum and Glenorchy Art and Sculpture Park.

Schools in the area include Glenorchy Primary School, Cosgrove High School, Guilford Young College and Dominic College.

Glenorchy is passed through by the Main Road of Greater Hobart, and the Brooker Highway which is the main connection to surrounding councils. When the Brooker Highway was built in 1952, it extended from Hobart to Berriedale. During this time, areas of Glenorchy and Moonah undertook street widening works in order to cope with increased traffic from the south.

Significant areas of Glenorchy include:
Elwick is the name given to the area east of the Brooker Highway, including the Elwick Racecourse (where the Hobart Cup is raced) and the Hobart Showground, which represents all of Southern Tasmania.
Merton refers to the Barossa Road area, and the surrounding bushlands between Glenorchy and Lenah Valley.
O'Brien's Bridge is the name given to the site of first settlement in 1809.

At the 2016 Australian census, the suburban Glenorchy area had a population of 10,828, with the Glenorchy City population totalling 46,397.

Retail

The Glenorchy Central business district  has three major indoor shopping centres, Northgate Shopping Centre, Glenorchy Central (Centro), and Glenorchy Plaza. Leading retail stores in Glenorchy include Best & Less, Coles, Woolworths, Big W, and Target, as well as a Bunnings located on the eastern edge of the Hobart show grounds on the Brooker Highway near Goodwood, with access via Howard Rd.

Glenorchy has the second largest shopping district in Tasmania, following the Hobart CBD. Glenorchy CBD is one of the three main commercial districts in Glenorchy City, as well as those in Moonah and Claremont.

References

External links

Australian Places (Monash University): Glenorchy, Tasmania
http://profile.id.com.au/glenorchy

 
Working class in Australia
Localities of City of Glenorchy